Muthu Kulikka Vaarieyala is a 1995 Indian Tamil-language romantic comedy film written and directed by K. S. Ravikumar, from a story by Chandra Kumar. The film stars Khushbu, Vignesh and Sanghavi. It was released on 10 March 1995.

Plot 

Chellappa, a villager, returns to his village after finishing his education, and falls in love with his neighbour Sundari. Her father, the panchayat president, threatens to shoot her if the affair becomes public knowledge. He wants Sundari to marry his relative Raja, who owns part of the land he has been taking care of while Raja is serving at the military.

Cast 
 Khushbu as a deranged woman
 Vignesh as Chellappa
 Sanghavi as Sundari
 Vinu Chakravarthy as the panchayat president
 Vichithra as a village belle
 K. S. Ravikumar as Raja
 Goundamani
 Senthil
 Vinodhini
 Vivek

Production 
Muthu Kulikka Vaarieyala was written and directed by K. S. Ravikumar, from a story by Chandra Kumar, who also wrote the dialogues. The film was produced by V. Giri under Thrimurthy Films, photographed by Asok Rajan and edited by K. Thanigachalam. Cheran was an assistant director.

Soundtrack 
The soundtrack was composed by Soundaryan, and the lyrics were written by Kalidasan.

Release and reception 
Muthu Kulikka Vaarieyala was released on 10 March 1995. K. Vijiyan of New Straits Times wrote, "Despite the lack of real big stars, Ravikumar manages to keep us in our seats without making us fidgety. This is a tribute to his talents". R. P. R. of Kalki wrote that Ravikumar, as director and actor, overshadowed everyone else.

References

External links 
 

1990s Tamil-language films
1995 romantic comedy films
Films directed by K. S. Ravikumar
Indian romantic comedy films